Josephine Obermann (born 15 June 1983 in Rastatt) is a German curler.

At the international level, she won a silver medal at the 2011 European Mixed Curling Championship.

Teams

Women's

Mixed

References

External links
 
 
 Team Jentsch official site  (web archive)
 Video:
 
  (World Curling TV)

Living people
1983 births
People from Rastatt
Sportspeople from Karlsruhe (region)
German female curlers

Competitors at the 2011 Winter Universiade